Beraeidae is a family of caddisflies belonging to the order Trichoptera.

Genera:
 Beraea Stephens, 1833
 Beraeamyia Mosely, 1930
 Beraeodes Eaton, 1867
 Beraeodina Mosely, 1931
 Bereodes Eaton, 1867
 Ernodes Wallengren, 1891
 Nippoberaea Botosaneanu, Nozaki & Kagaya, 1995
 Notoernodes Andersen & Kjaerandsen, 1997
 Thya Curtis, 1834

References

Integripalpia
Trichoptera families